Chitting is a method of preparing potatoes or other tubers for planting. The seed potatoes are placed in a tray (often in egg cartons) in a light and cool place but shielded from direct sunlight. All but three or four of the "eyes" (sprouting parts) of the potato are removed, leaving the strongest growths only.

External links 

 Chitting and forcing potatoes (Daily Telegraph, 22nd Jan 2010).

Plant reproduction
Agronomy